A range of naval vessels were used in New Zealand from its early settlement years to the formation of the New Zealand Naval Forces in 1913. In the mid-19th century, these vessels included frigates, sloops, schooners, and steam-driven paddlewheel boats. In 1846, five years after New Zealand was first proclaimed a colony, it bought its first gunboat. In the 1840s and 1850s, steam boats were used to survey the ports and the coastline. In the 1860s, New Zealand established the Waikato flotilla, its first de facto navy.

By the late 19th century, New Zealand was using cruisers and torpedo boats. In the 1880s, in response to the Russian scares, coastal defences were established, a mine-laying steamer was ordered, and spar torpedo boats began patrolling the main ports. In 1911, New Zealand funded the construction of a battlecruiser, and in 1913, the New Zealand Naval Forces were created as a separate division within the Royal Navy.

Early settlers

Polynesian settlers

The initial settlement of New Zealand occurred around 1280 CE when it was discovered by Polynesians who arrived in oceangoing canoes, or waka. The descendants of these settlers became known as the Māori, forming a distinct culture centred on kinship links and land.
The earliest war boats to operate in New Zealand were the large decorated war canoes or waka taua of the Māori. These could be over 30 metres long and were manned by up to 100 paddlers. It was a double hulled waka that rammed the ship's boat of Abel Tasman enabling Maori to board and kill 4 sailors. Waka taua were used to transport warriors to and from battle especially during the Musket War period 1805 to 1843. Less often battles were fought at sea. In late 1863 many waka on the Waikato River were destroyed by New Zealand militia to prevent rebelling Maori from attacking Auckland. Settlers were annoyed that the waka had not been destroyed earlier in the war. This had allowed rebelling Kingitanga Maori from the Waikato to cross into Auckland and murder a total of 18 settlers living on the outskirts of Auckland. Waka taua are no longer used in warfare, but they are still built and used for ceremonial purposes. Replica waka taua are built in traditional wood, fibreglass and plastic.

European settlers
The first European known to reach New Zealand was the Dutch explorer Abel Tasman, who arrived with his ships Heemskerck and Zeehaen in 1642. Over 100 years later, in 1769, the British naval captain James Cook of HM Bark Endeavour made the first of his three visits. From the late 18th century, the country was increasingly visited by British, French and American whaling, sealing and trading ships. In 1841 New Zealand became a British colony followed by a period of wars. New Zealand gradually became more self-governing and achieved the relative independence of a dominion in 1907.

In 1788 the colony of New South Wales was founded with a commission that technically included responsibility for New Zealand. In practice this had little consequence, since the New South Wales administration was not really interested in New Zealand. From the 1790s the New Zealand coast was increasingly visited by explorers, traders and adventurers. They traded European goods, including guns and metal tools, for food, water, wood, flax and sex. European settlement increased through the early decades of the 19th century, establishing trading stations and buying land from the Māori. However different concepts of land ownership led to increasing conflict and bitterness. Missionaries were also settling, attempting to convert Māori to Christianity and control European lawlessness.

In 1839, the New Zealand Company announced plans to establish colonies in New Zealand. This alarmed the missionaries, who called for more British control. Captain William Hobson was sent to New Zealand to persuade Māori to cede their sovereignty to the British Crown. On 6 February 1840, Hobson and Māori chiefs signed the Treaty of Waitangi at Waitangi in the Bay of Islands.

Surveying the coast
The first general charting of the New Zealand coast was done with great competence by Cook on his first visit in 1769. The chart was published in 1772 and remained current for 66 years.

By 1840 several Royal Navy ships were engaged in hydrographic surveys directed by the Admiralty. The Britomart was a  brig-sloop of the Royal Navy. In this survey, he named Britomart Point after his ship. Stanley was a talented painter, but he seemed to suffer from a temporary lack of invention when he named another prominent point the Second Point. Today this is called Stanley Point.

A detailed survey of the New Zealand coast was essential for economic development and in 1848 , a steam paddle sloop, began the "Great Survey".  took over and continued until 1856, when the harbours and most of the coast had been freshly surveyed. In the 1890s until 1905,  updated the surveys.

New Zealand Wars

From 1840 immigration, mainly from the United Kingdom, increased markedly. New Zealand became a colony of Britain in its own right on 3 May 1841, and the New Zealand Constitution Act of 1852 established central and provincial governments.

As more European immigrants (Pākehā) arrived, the pressure on the indigenous Māori to sell land increased. Māori initially welcomed Pākehā for the trading opportunities and the opportunity to learn new technologies, but by the late 1850s some Maori began to resent the loss of their autonomy. The Hapu (sub-tribes) who willingly sold their land by the late 1850s were refusing to sell and putting pressure on other Maori to do the same. Some tribes such at Ngāi Tahu in the South Island sold vast areas of land. For Māori, land (whenua) was not just an economic resource but the basis of their identity and a connection with their ancestors. Land was normally in the control of the chiefs of hapu. Land sale records show that hapu and their leaders still willingly sold land to the government. Pākehā, especially from 1860, were keen to buy more land. This clashed with the decision of the militant Kingitanga Maori in the Waikato to refuse to sell.

This refusal to sell land and an attempt to set up an independent Kingitanga state was seen as rebellion by the government and was the primary cause of the New Zealand Wars in the 1860s, when the Taranaki and Waikato regions were  scenes of conflict between the New Zealand government supported by British troops, colonial troops, local militia and loyal (kupapa) Maori fighting against the rebelling Kingite Maori . On their defeat in 1864 the Māori rebels forfeited some of their land. 3% of New Zealand's land was taken, although large areas of this were reserved for Maori and some of the land was never surveyed or occupied and subsequently returned to Maori. Defeat of the rebels was aided by the large flotilla of vessels brought to New Zealand by General Cameron in 1863 to operate in the Waikato River. The flotilla comprised shallow draught boats, including gunboats and barges for transporting troops and supplies, as the front line moved progressively south. Many of these vessels were sourced from Australia and captained by experienced Australian officers. Cameron also opened a second maritime link by bringing troops and supplies over the Raglan bar and building a redoubt at Raglan. Troops were marched over an old Maori trail that was widened by the Forest Rangers to allow access to the area north of Pirongia.

Royal Navy

In the early years of European settlement, New Zealand's naval defence consisted of occasional visits by ships of the Royal Navy based on New South Wales. There was no base in New Zealand.

In the quarter century from 1845, some twenty Royal Navy ships took part in actions between Māori and Pākehā, with the colonial government taking up some commercial ships in supporting roles. Another contribution came on loan from Australia, in the form of the Victorian naval screw steam sloop Victoria, in the first Taranaki conflict of 1860–61. They and the East Indiaman Elphinstone provided gun and crew, to form militia units for fighting ashore. The ships served mainly as communication, transport and supply links between places of conflict but, more importantly perhaps, also served as real symbols of British authority in areas where conflict was close to breaking out, or already had.

Since roads were few and poorly formed, the sea, with all its hazards was often the only practical means of communication. Royal Navy ships and their well-trained and disciplined crews were the mainstays of battles and skirmishes.

First gunboat
In 1846 the Colonial Records of Revenue and Expenditure listed the purchase of a gunboat for Porirua Harbour for 100 pounds 17 shillings and 6 pence. This modest acquisition was the first boat purchased by a governing authority in New Zealand for use as a vessel of war.

The boat was a longboat which had been recovered from the wreck of the barque Tyne, near Sinclair Head, Wellington on 4 July 1845. No name for the boat is mentioned in any sources. Carpenters from HMS Calliope converted her into a gunboat. She was lengthened, fitted with a 12 pdr carronade at the bow, and equipped also with a small brass gun as protection against musket shot.

The Calliope took the boat to Porirua in July 1846. The gunboat was used for some time at Porirua on patrol duty, manned mainly by crew from the Calliope. In December it was transferred to Wanganui, again aboard Calliope. At Wanganui a young crew member accidentally wounded a Māori chief with a pistol. The Māori wanted the surrender of the youth, which was refused, and this was the direct cause of the Gilfillan murders. The gunboat saw more action in Wanganui until, damaged by its own gun recoil, it was disarmed in late 1847.

Assistance from Australia

In March 1860 the First Taranaki War started, and the colonial government requested help from Royal Navy and other ships based in Australia. In June 1860, HMS Pelorus, the flagship of the Australian Squadron of the Royal Navy, participated in the attack on Puketakauere pā during the First Taranaki War. Later that year, the crew landed at Kairau to support British troops under attack from Māori and in January 1861 a gun crew from the ship helped defend the British redoubt at Huirangi against the Māori.

In 1862, HMS Orpheus replaced Pelorus as flagship of the Australian Squadron. In February 1863, while delivering naval supplies and troop reinforcements to Auckland, Orpheus was wrecked on the sandbars at the entrance to Manukau Harbour. Of the ship's complement of 259, 189 died in the disaster. It was New Zealand's worst maritime tragedy.

In 1856, the Australian Colony of Victoria had received its own naval vessel, HMCSS Victoria. In 1860 Victoria deployed also to assist the New Zealand colonial government. When Victoria returned to Australia the vessel had suffered one fatality and taken part in several minor actions.

Waikato Flotilla
The following tables cover the ships (seagoing and river gunboats) which were purchased, requisitioned or purpose built for the New Zealand Colonial Government, for duties connected with the New Zealand Wars in the Waikato, Bay of Plenty and Taranaki, during the decade from 1860.

In addition, the Royal Navy operated HMS Curacoa, Esk, Fawn and Miranda out of Auckland, plus Eclipse and Harrier on the Manukau. This maintained a Royal Navy presence in these regions during the 1863–64 Waikato conflict, both as warships and in providing personnel for the fighting on land (the Naval Brigade) and for operating the Waikato flotilla.

Though there was no official New Zealand navy the ships were run as a naval force and transport service, and in that sense constitute the first New Zealand navy. However the flotilla was largely manned by Royal Navy personnel.

River boats

The Waikato River rises in the eastern slopes of Mount Ruapehu and flows through the Tongariro River system and Lake Taupo, New Zealand's largest lake, before running 400 kilometres though the Waikato Plains until it empties into the sea at Port Waikato. The river and its tributary Waipā River, joining at Ngāruawāhia, took the British forces right into the heart of the war. Some of the river ships went up as far as (now) Cambridge on the Waikato and almost to Pirongia on the Waipa (using present place names).
{| class="wikitable"
|-
! Name
! Type
! Armament
! Service
! Grt
! Dimensions
! Built / Fate
|-
| Avon
| paddle steamer
| 1 x 12 pdr1 rocket tube
| 1862–68
| 43
| 17.7 x 4.7 m58.2 x 15.4 ft
| Built 1860 at Lyttelton of ironWrecked 1886 in Blind Bay
|-
| Gundagai
| Supply and troop ship.
| 
| 1864–66
| 139
| 36.6 x 4.9 m120 x 16 ft
| Built 1855 at Goolwa of ironWrecked 1886 Patea bar
|-
| Koheroa
| stern wheel gunboat
| 2 x 12 pdr in embrasures1 rocket tube
| 1864–67
| 
| 27.6 x 6.1 m90.6 x 20 ft
| Built 1864 at Sydney of iron and reassembled at Port WaikatoWrecked 1868 off Cape Palliser
|-
| Moutoa
| 
| 
| 1865–68
| 79
| 30.6 x 4.3 m100 x 14.2 ft
| Built 1865 at Port Waikato of woodReported in 1897 as having been re-engineered.
|-
| Pioneer
|  stern wheel gunboat
| 2 x 12 pdr in cupolas1 rocket tube
| 1863–66
| 300
| 46.6 x 6.1 m153 x 20 ft
| Built 1863 at Sydney of ironWrecked 1866 on the Manukau Harbour bar
|-
| Prince Alfred
| 
|
| 1864–65
| 163
| 36 x 6.6 m118 x 21.6 ft
| Built 1861 at Adelaide of woodBurnt out (arson) late 1880s, beached at Rocky Point, Port Chalmers
|-
| [/Hamilton_East,_New_Zealand?veswitched=1#Paddle_steamer_Rangiriri|Rangiriri| stern wheel gunboat
| 2 x 12 pdr in embrasures1 rocket tube
| 1864–70
| 
| 27.6 x 6.1 m90.6 x 20 ft
| Built 1864 at Sydney of iron an reassembled at Port WaikatoAbandoned c1890 in Waikato River. Raised 1982 and incorporated as historic monument in riverbank park at Parana Park in 2009.
|-
| Sturt|
| 
| 1864–70
| 157
| 41.8 x 7 m137 x 23 ft
| Built 1856 in Adelaide of ironWrecked 1870 Waimakariri River bar.
|}

The 300-ton Pioneer, built in Sydney, is the first warship purpose-built for the New Zealand Government. She served the whole Waikato war. She was followed by two more purpose-built boats, the sister ships Koheroa and Rangiriri.

Coastal boats
Most of the seagoing ships served first on the Waikato ( e.g. Gundagai, Lady Barkly, Sturt) and were later used for troop and stores transport between coastal ports. A substantial naval dockyard with workshops was set up at Putataka (now Port Waikato) where the gunboats and barges were built and repaired. The dockyard and other depots were closed down and the flotilla dispersed after the New Zealand Wars ended in 1867.

Fears of Russian invasion
A long-standing fear of invasion by the Imperial Russian Navy, symbolised by the hoax Russian warship Kaskowiski raid on Auckland, 1875, led to the arming of New Zealand ports with heavy guns in the decade from about 1880. A further hoax Russian warship attack, this time in Wellington in 1885, was spurred by fears over French, German and Russian policies in the South Pacific, late in 1883.

Mine-laying steamers
As a contribution to port defences the government ordered a small "submining" steamer from Scotland. It was shipped to Wellington for assembly in sections, fitted with a locally made engine, named Ellen Ballance, and went into service about 1884. She was put under the responsibility of army engineers, who gained Engineer Corp status in May 1887.

Submarine mining was the laying of defensive mines on the seabed about port entrances. In 1898 the New Zealand forces commander advised the government that Ellen Ballance was dangerous for laying out mines in anything approaching bad weather. He recommended that two "proper" submarine minelaying steamers should be acquired, one for Auckland and one for Wellington. This was approved, and in October 1900 the construction of two enlarged Napier of Magdala type vessels were ordered. These were named Janie Seddon and Lady Roberts.Ellen Ballance went to Lyttelton soon after being replaced by Janie Seddon, and then to Otago Harbour in October 1905 as transport to RNZ Artillery gun emplacements such as Ripapa Island and Taiaroa Head.

Spar torpedo boats

A further consequence of the Russian scares was that four standard design second-class spar torpedo boats were ordered, one for each of the main ports. These were built in 1883 by John Thornycroft & Co, London. They displaced 12 tons and measured 18.2 x 2.3 x 1 m (63 x 7.5 x 3.2 feet). Their main weapon was an 11 m (36 ft) spar, projecting well forward over the bow, armed at its tip with an explosive device. A Nordenfelt gun was also fitted.

The idea was that the boat would proceed at high speed towards the side of an enemy warship, where it would detonate the explosive at the end of its spar. The spar boats were constructed for speed, so they were narrow and shallow, and were armoured with plating only 1.6 mm thick. They could not operate in anything like rough water, and using them as attack vessels may well have been as hazardous for the crew as the target. They were obsolete before they were completed, and only the last two had the up-to-date Whitehead "fish" torpedo fitted when built.

In 1884 torpedo boat units were formed to operate them. They were organised in a similar way to the artillery "Navals" with appropriate naval uniforms. They were at first called the Torpedo Branch of the Armed Constabulary. Then in June 1887 they were gazetted as a permanent militia and given the formal, but more manageable title, Torpedo Corps. The torpedo boats had galvanized plating, which meant they could not stay in the water and had to be kept on slipways. Each Torpedo Corps had its own quarters and boatshed. Their main role soon became training, and by 1900 they were well out of date. Naval Reserve History

Late 1880s – early 1900s

Calliope Dock

An event that was to have an important bearing on New Zealand naval policy in later years was the official opening on 16 February 1888 of the Calliope graving dock. This was constructed over three years by the Auckland Harbour Board at Calliope Point on the Devonport shore.

In 1892 the Admiralty acquired from the Harbour Board  of reclaimed land adjacent to the dock so they could develop naval workshops.Bell (1962)

Subsidies to the Royal Navy
For years the Royal Navy operated an imperial squadron in Australia called the "Australian Squadron". The 1887 Imperial Conference in London lead to a naval agreement that the Australian Squadron would be supplemented by another squadron, a joint Australian and New Zealand naval force of five cruisers and two torpedo gunboats. These ships would be based in Sydney and called the "Australasian Auxiliary Squadron". Two ships, one from the Imperial squadron and one from the new squadron, would be stationed in New Zealand waters. An annual subsidy of £120,000 was to be paid to London by Australia and New Zealand, of which New Zealand's share was £20,000.

This policy of subsidising Imperial navy forces allowed the Admiralty to retain central control over the navies, yet for New Zealand it guaranteed a cruiser presence in their waters. It also allowed New Zealanders direct entry into the Royal Navy. This arrangement suited both parties and remained in force for the next twenty years. The 1902 Imperial Conference modified the Naval Agreement and New Zealand's annual subsidy increased to £40,000. The subsidy was further increased in 1908 to £100,000.

A training ship
In 1907 the Marine Department acquired an 805-ton gun boat and converted her to  New Zealand's first training ship NZS Amokura. Over the next 14 years, 527 boys trained in her, 25 of them going on to naval service and most of the others into the merchant marine.NZ Maritime record: NZS Amokura 1906–1955

The boat was originally a three masted auxiliary barquentine, square rigged on the foremast, fore-and-aft on the after masts. Her hull was composite; carvel teak planking on steel frames.

Gift of battlecruiser

In 1909, Great Britain was in the middle of a naval and political crisis; Germany had expanded her naval programme and was speeding up the building of ships of all classes. On 22 March 1909 the Prime Minister of New Zealand, Sir Joseph Ward, made an offer to fund "one first-class battleship, and if need be, two" as a gift to the Royal Navy. This offer was accepted by the British Government and the battlecruiser HMS New Zealand was built by Fairfield for £1,783,190.

The New Zealand was commissioned on 23 November 1912 with three New Zealand officers. After being inspected by the King, she sailed on a ten-month world cruise, arriving in Wellington in April 1913. For ten weeks she called at every port and was inspected by an estimated half a million people, nearly half the population of the country.

New Zealand took part in all three major naval actions in the North Sea: at Heligoland Bight, Dogger Bank and Jutland. She also contributed to the sinking of two cruisers.

Throughout these battles the captain wore a Māori piupiu (a warrior's skirt of rolled flax) and a greenstone hei-tiki, given to the ship by an old chieftain in 1913 with the injunction that they were always to be worn by the captain of the New Zealand when she was fighting. The seamen showed much faith in these Māori mascots. According to lower deck legend, the gift included the prophecy that the ship would one day be in action and be hit in three places, but her casualties would not be heavy (this turned out to be true).

The New Zealand was scrapped in 1923. Her  guns came to New Zealand and were used at Fort Dorset and Godley Head. The piupiu also came back to New Zealand and is now in the possession of the Royal New Zealand Naval Museum.

Timeline

 c. 1300: War canoes or waka taua of the Māori
 1642: Abel Tasman visits in his ships Heemskerck and Zeehaen 1769: James Cook visits in his barque HM Bark Endeavour
 1788: The colony of New South Wales is founded with a technical responsibility for New Zealand. In practice they had little interest and the responsibility was withdrawn in 1841
 1790s: British, French and American whaling, sealing and trading ships start arriving in numbers.
 1840: The Treaty of Waitangi is signed bringing New Zealand into the British Empire and giving Māori equal rights with British citizens.
 1840: Auckland becomes the capital
 1840: Captain Owen Stanley on HMS Britomart draws up an Admiralty Chart of the Waitematā Harbour
 1840s: The rate of European settlement, primarily from the United Kingdom, becomes considerable.
 1841: New Zealand is proclaimed a colony, independent of New South Wales, and divided into provinces.
 1846: First steam warship to visit New Zealand, HMS Driver, 20 Jan 1846
 1846: First gunboat purchased by a governing authority in New Zealand
 1848: HMS Acheron, a steam paddle sloop, begins the "Great Survey" of the New Zealand coast
 1852: The New Zealand Constitution Act is passed establishing a colonial government.
 1856: First detailed hydrographic survey of New Zealand ports and the coastline completed.
 1859: The number of white settlers (Pākehā) exceeds the number of Māori.
 1860: Naval help is sought from Australia as land wars escalate.
 1862–1870: To assist in the land wars a temporary navy is established. This is the Waikato flotilla, New Zealand's first de facto navy, comprising eight river boats, four armoured barges, five coastal boats and a naval dockyard.
 1863: The 300 ton stern wheel gunboat Pioneer, built in Sydney, is the first warship purpose-built for the New Zealand Government. She is followed by two sister ships, Koheroa and Rangiriri.
 1880s: In response to Russian scares coastal defences are established in the main ports.
 1882: The first submarine mining steamer is ordered.
 1884: A spar torpedo boat is attached to each of the main ports.
It is the largest in the southern hemisphere.
 1887: The Imperial Conference in London establishes the Australasian Auxiliary Squadron. New Zealand agrees to pay an annual subsidy of £20,000.
 1904: The Imperial Conference in London increases the annual subsidy to £40,000.
 1907: New Zealand changes from being a colony to a separate dominion within the commonwealth.
 1907: The Marine Department acquires an 800-ton gun boat and converts her to the New Zealand's first training ship, NZS Amokura.
 1908: The dreadnought battleship race with Germany starts and the Imperial Conference in London increases the annual subsidy to £100,000.
 1908: Construction of a naval wharf and workshops at Calliope Point begins, funded by the Admiralty.
 1911: New Zealand gives the battlecruiser, HMS New Zealand, to Britain.
 1911: The number of white settlers (Pākehā) reaches one million
 1913: New Zealand Naval Forces are created as a separate division within the Royal Navy and the history of the naval forces of New Zealand is continued in that article.

See also
 History of the Royal New Zealand Navy
 Coastal fortifications of New Zealand

Notes

References
 Baillie, Herbert (1919) The First New Zealand Navy Transactions and Proceedings of the Royal Society of New Zealand, Volume 53.
 Barclay-Kerr, Hoturoa (2007) Waka taua – The largest waka, Te Ara – the Encyclopedia of New Zealand, updated 21-Sep-2007
 Bell, J A (1962) Development of naval repair facilities at Auckland, 1841–1962
 Cowan, James (originally published 1930, republished by New Zealand Electronic Text Centre)  The Māori: Yesterday and Today Whitcombe and Tombs
 Cowan, James (1955) The New Zealand wars Volumes I 2 volumes, R E Owen, Wellington (originally published 1922, republished by New Zealand Electronic Text Centre) 
 Dennerly, Peter (2002) The Development of New Zealand's Navy, 6th Ed 
 Glen, Frank G (1982) For Glory and a Farm : Australian involvement during the New Zealand Wars, Journals of the NZ Military Historical Society, 1982–83
 Lawn, C A (1977) The Pioneer Land Surveyors of New Zealand New Zealand Institute of Surveyors
 Marshall, Brian (2005) From Sextants to Satellites: A Cartographic Time Line for New Zealand The New Zealand Map Society Journal, No 18.
 McDougall, R J (1989) New Zealand Naval Vessels. Government Printing Office. 
 Rusden, George William (1883) History of New Zealand, Vol I, Page 442  ?
 Waters, Sydney David (1956, republished by New Zealand Electronic Text Centre) The Royal New Zealand Navy.  Historical Publications Branch, Wellington:

 Chapter 1: Genesis of Royal New Zealand Navy
 Appendix I: The first New Zealand Navy
 Appendix VII: Record of HMS New Zealand
 Appendix IX: New Zealand Training Ship Amokura

 Wright, Matthew (2001) Blue water Kiwis : New Zealand's naval story.'' Reed.  Review

External links
 New Zealand Navy Museum: Figurehead, HMS Eclipse 
 Baillie, Herbert The First New Zealand Navy (eText)
 Baigent, A J (1959) Coast Artillery Defences
 Flotilla of the Waikato River 
 Otago Library: 75 Years of the New Zealand Navy 
 NZ Maritime record: Hinemoa 1875–1944
 NZ Maritime record: Spar torpedo boat Defender
 Best, Elsdon (1914) The Shadow of War
 Papers Past description of 1864 Koheroa

Military history of New Zealand
Royal New Zealand Navy
Ships of the Royal New Zealand Navy